This is a list of adult fiction books that topped The New York Times Fiction Best Seller list in 1997.

See also

 New York Times Nonfiction Best Sellers of 1997
 1997 in literature
 Lists of The New York Times Fiction Best Sellers
 Publishers Weekly list of bestselling novels in the United States in the 1990s

References

1997
.
1997 in the United States